Yingge dance, Yingge, Engor (Chinese: 英歌; Mandarin Chinese: Yīnggē), or "Hero's Song," is a form of Chinese folk dance originating from the Ming Dynasty. It is very popular in Teochew, a region in the east of Guangdong and is one of the most representative form of folk arts. The performers makeup into 108 Stars of Destiny, holding the two small stick or tambourine to perform.

See also
Yangge
Dance of China
Chinese fitness dancing

External links
Cultural Characteristics and Developmental Prospects of Chaoshan Ying-Ge Dance

Syllabus-free dance
Dances of China
Teochew culture
Dance in China